Radun (Radin) is a town in Belarus, in the Voranava district, Grodno Region.

History
Before the second world war, around 1,000 Jews lived in town. It was the home of Rabbi Yisrael Meir Kagan, known as the Chofetz Chaim, and his Raduń Yeshiva founded in 1869.

After the Invasion of Poland in September 1939, Radun was occupied by the Soviet Union and incorporated into the Byelorussian SSR on 14 November 1939. In 1940, most of the yeshiva students were transferred to the United States via Japan.

From June 1941 until 13 July 1944, Radun was occupied by Germany and administered as a part of the Generalbezirk Weißruthenien of Reichskommissariat Ostland. On November 16, 1941, a fenced ghetto was established on Zhydovska Street, previously a Jewish street. There were also Jews from neighbouring villages gathered in the ghetto: Dovguielishki, Zabolote, Zhyrmuny and Nacha. More than 2,000 Jews were confined inside the ghetto. 

On May 10, 1942, 100 young Jews were requisitioned to dig pits in the Jewish cemetery. As the working Jews attempted a mass-escape, many of them were shot. When the ghetto was liquidated, more than 1,500 Jews were killed by the Germans and the local police. Nearly 300 skilled artisans were kept alive, and later sent to Shchuchin ghetto and from there, after a while, to their deaths in an unknown location. As of 2018, there were no Jews living in Radun.

See also
Raduń Yeshiva

References

External links
 

Holocaust locations in Belarus
Jewish communities destroyed in the Holocaust
Lidsky Uyezd
Nowogródek Voivodeship (1919–1939)
Populated places in Grodno Region
Urban-type settlements in Belarus
Vilnius Voivodeship
Voranava District